Palaina levicostulata, also known as the fine-ribbed staircase snail, is a species of staircase snail that is endemic to Australia's Lord Howe Island in the Tasman Sea.

Description
The conical pupiform shell of adult snails is 4.9–5.1 mm in height, with a diameter of 2.4–2.6 mm and a conical spire. It is very pale to dark golden-brown in colour, sometimes with a white peripheral band on the final whorl. It has fine, closely spaced, axal ribs. The umbilicus is closed. The circular aperture has a strongly reflected lip and an operculum is present. The animal has a white body with dark grey cephalic tentacles and black eyes.

Habitat
The snail is most common in the Settlement region, with a few records from elsewhere on the island.

References

 
levicostulata
Gastropods of Lord Howe Island
Taxa named by Tom Iredale
Gastropods described in 1944